Nermin Karić (born 23 June 1999) is a Swedish football player of Bosnian descent, who plays as a defensive midfielder for Italian  club Benevento.

Club career

The beginnings: Genoa and Avellino 
Born in Norrköping, Karić started his career in the youth ranks of IF Sylvia, before moving to the Italian Serie A team Genoa in the summer of 2017. He played for Genoa's Under-19 squad in the 2017–18 and 2018–19 season, but he never featured for the senior squad.

On 22 August 2019, Karić joined Serie C club Avellino on a season-long loan.

He subsequently made his professional debut for Avellino on 7 September 2019, during a game against Teramo. He substituted Julián Illanes in the 70th minute and scored his first professional goal 4 minutes later, establishing the final score of 2–0.

Südtirol
On 13 August 2020, Karić joined fellow Serie C club Südtirol and signed a three-year contract.

He immediately established himself as a regular starter within the Tyrolean team, becoming one of the most highly-rated young midfielders in the league and helping his side reaching the promotion play-offs, where Südtirol eventually lost on aggregate to Karić's former team Avellino in the quarter-finals.

The midfielder played his last game for Südtirol on August 28, 2021, coming in as a substitute for Marco Beccaro in the 62nd minute of the 1-0 win against Virtus Verona, the opening game of the 2021-22 season of Serie C.

Virtus Entella 
On 31 August 2021, the deadline day of the summer transfer window, it was announced that Karić had agreed to join Virtus Entella on a permanent basis, thus setting himself for his third consecutive experience in Serie C.

Benevento 
On 5 July 2022, Karić joined Serie B side Benevento.

References

External links
 

1999 births
Living people
Sportspeople from Norrköping
Swedish people of Bosnia and Herzegovina descent
Swedish footballers
Association football midfielders
Serie B players
Serie C players
Genoa C.F.C. players
U.S. Avellino 1912 players
F.C. Südtirol players
Virtus Entella players
Benevento Calcio players
Swedish expatriate footballers
Swedish expatriate sportspeople in Italy
Expatriate footballers in Italy
Sweden youth international footballers
Footballers from Östergötland County